Limnohabitans curvus is an aerobic, nonmotile bacterium from the genus Limnohabitans and  family Comamonadaceae, which was isolated from the pelagic zone from a freshwater lake in Mondsee in Austria.

References

External links
Type strain of Limnohabitans curvus at BacDive -  the Bacterial Diversity Metadatabase

Comamonadaceae